Local elections were held in the Federation of Malaya in 1956.

Municipal election

George Town

Kuala Lumpur

Malacca

Town councils election

Alor Star

Bandar Maharani, Muar

Bandar Penggaram, Batu Pahat

Bukit Mertajam

Butterworth

Ipoh-Menglembu

Johore Bahru

Kampar

Klang

Kluang

Kota Bharu

Kuala Kangsar

Kuala Trengganu

Kuantan

Pasir Mas

Pasir Puteh

Raub

Segamat

Seremban

Sungei Patani

Taiping

Teluk Anson

Tumpat

Local councils election

Kedah

References

1956
1956 elections in Malaya
1956 elections in Asia